The rosters of all participating teams at the women's tournament of the 2018 Rugby World Cup Sevens.

Australia 

Head coach: John Manenti

Brazil 

Head coach:  Reuben Samuel

Canada 

Head coach: John Tait

China 

Head coach:  Chad Shepherd

England 

Head coach: James Bailey

Fiji 

Head coach: Iliesa Tanivula

France 

Head coach: David Courteix

Ireland 

Head coach:  Anthony Eddy

Japan 

Head coach: Hitoshi Inada

Mexico 

Head coach:  Robin MacDowell

New Zealand 

Head coach: Allan Bunting

Papua New Guinea 

Head coach: John Larry

Russia 

Head coach: Andrey Kuzin

South Africa 

Head Coach: Paul Delport

Spain 

Head coach: Pedro de Matías

United States 

Head coach: Richie Walker

Alev Kelter was initially selected as part of the squad, but was still recovering from injuries and so was substituted with Kelsi Stockert.

References 

Rugby World Cup Sevens squads
Squads
World